Asmita Sood  (born 20 December 1989) is an Indian model and actress. She made her acting debut with the 2011 Telugu film Brammigadi Katha. Sood has endorsed over 40 brands. She has been a part of two television shows: Star Plus's Phir Bhi Na Maane...Badtameez Dil and Sony TV's Dil Hi Toh Hai.

Early life 
Asmita Sood hails from Shimla, Himachal Pradesh. She is a commerce graduate.

Career 
She is The Co-Founder of Off-Grid.Off-Grid is India's brand new techno music festival, a venture of actress Asmita and music enthusiast and lawyer Aman Lakhani. More than 600 revelers from across the country traveled to witness the music festival which was held at Kullu.

Modeling career 
Sood started her modelling career towards the end of 2010 after participating in TV reality show Channel V's Get Gorgeous. She later participated at the 2011 Femina Miss India beauty pageant, ending up as one of the finalists. She is a professionally trained Kathak dancer.

Film career
Sood made her acting debut with a Telugu film Brammigadi Katha (2011), which also stars Varun Sandesh in the lead role. It had a 50-day box office run. In 2013, Sood debuted in Kannada films with Victory, which also stars Sharan in the lead role. It was followed by her Malayalam debut in the anthology 5 Sundarikal in which she played Ami, a Muslim girl who gets married at a young age.

She was next seen opposite Sudheer Babu in the Telugu film Aadu Magaadra Bujji. In the film she played Indu, a "bubbly and chirpy college-goer". Sood's following releases were Aa Aiduguru (2013), in which she was seen as a police officer, and Ok (2013). In 2015, she was shooting for her second Malayalam film, Lukka Chuppi.

Television career
She also worked in a Hindi show Phir Bhi Na Maane...Badtameez Dil on Star Plus as Meher Purohit opposite Pearl V Puri. She was about to play the role of Gauri in Qayamat Ki Raat, but later on Karishma Tanna was finalized to play the role. In 2018, She was seen as Setu in Sony TV's Dil Hi Toh Hai which ended in 2020. Currently, she is playing the negative role in Dangal TV show Janam Janam Ka Saath opposite Gaurav S Bajaj.

Music videos
She appeared in the music videos Filhall (2019) with Akshay Kumar.

Filmography

Films

Television shows

Web series

Music videos

References

External links

 

1989 births
Actresses in Kannada cinema
Actresses in Malayalam cinema
Actresses in Telugu cinema
Indian film actresses
Living people
People from Shimla
Actresses from Himachal Pradesh
Actresses in Hindi television
Indian television actresses